Aechmea kertesziae is a plant species in the genus Aechmea. This species is native to southern Brazil.

References

kertesziae
Flora of Brazil
Plants described in 1952